Lepetani is a village in the municipality of Tivat, Montenegro. It is located north of Tivat.

Demographics
According to the 2011 census, it had a population of 184 people.

References

Croat communities in Montenegro
Populated places in Tivat Municipality